This is a list of Missouri covered bridges.  There are four historic wooden covered bridges in Missouri, all now listed as State Historic Sites and under the protection of the Missouri Department of Natural Resources.

State officials estimate that Missouri had about thirty covered bridges from the 1820s through the end of the 19th century.  On May 25, 1967, the state legislature authorized the Missouri State Park Board to take possession of the remaining bridges in order to repair and preserve them.  At the time, five covered bridges remained, but the Mexico covered bridge was destroyed in a flood later that year.

References

External links
 

Covered bridges in Missouri
Missouri covered bridges
Bridges, covered